KTLF (90.5 FM The Light) is a radio station broadcasting a Contemporary Worship format.  The station first signed on the air February 27, 1989 at 89.7 FM, originally broadcasting an Inspirational/Soft Christian Music/Praise & Worship format.  KTLF later swapped frequencies with Pikes Peak Community College station KEPC a few years later and boosted its power.  

The KTLF Radio network hosts several radio formats ranging from contemporary christian music to more traditional christian music, to instrumental music, and christian country music.

During the Christmas season KTLF plays Christmas music that is focused on Christ-centered songs and carols. Licensed to Colorado Springs, Colorado, United States, it serves the Colorado Springs area.  The station is currently owned by Educational Communications Of Colorado Springs, Inc.

The Light 
On The Light, you can expect to hear music akin to that of what you would hear in a worship service at church. The music is encouraging, uplifting, worshipful and filled with Hope. Regardless of whats going on in the world, with artists, or with the industry, the heart of the music remains the same, to praise and glorify God and to spread His Hope.

The Legacy 
Later KTLF would add The Legacy to its air'd formats. On The Legacy, you will hear the foundational and traditional music of yesteryear. Music that holds tremendous meaning and memories to its listeners. Though it may be dated compared to the more contemporary feel of todays music on The Light, it no less proclaims the Glory of Christ. This music continues to stand the test of time in its reflection of the Light and Hope in Christ and His glory and greatness.

The Word 
The Word is a talk format primarily featuring Moody Radio

Reflections 
In 2022, the KTLF Radio Network would add Reflections as a full format primarily streaming online. Reflections is one of their most beloved music formats. For years it has played solely in the evenings on The Light and The Legacy. Due to popular demand it was made a full format in late 2022.

Reflections plays soft instrumental christian hymns and classics. It is meant for a time of reflecting and spending time with our Lord. Yes, it can also be used and is used by many to wind down from the troubles of our days and even to fall asleep.

Red Letter Junction 
The Red Letter Junction format will officially launch in 2023.

On Red Letter Junction you can expect to hear show based content. Each of their shows has been created by folks that are not only super excited about whats in them, but the message of Christ and the impact it brings. You will hear shows like a top 40 countdown, Interviews with artists where they walk through an entire new album and hear about their heart while making the music, author interviews, Bluegrass Gospel, Christian classics from the 80’s, and so much more.

Blessed Country 
The Blessed Country format will officially launch in 2023.

Branding

 (KTLF's logo from 2006 to 2015)

For current branding designs, see their website at ktlf.radio

Network
In addition to the main station, KTLF is carried on an additional 12 stations and 22 translators to widen its broadcast area.

Translators

External links

TLF
Radio stations established in 1977
1977 establishments in Colorado
TLF